William Munford Tuck (September 28, 1896 – June 9, 1983) was an American lawyer and lieutenant in the Byrd Organization, who served as the 55th Governor of Virginia from 1946 to 1950 as a Democrat, and as a U.S. Congressman from 1953 until 1969.

Early and Family Life
He was the youngest of nine children of Halifax County, Virginia tobacco warehouseman Robert James Tuck (1863–1930)  and Virginia Susan Fitts (1860–1909). He was named for his grandfather William Munford Tuck (1832–1899), who served in the Third Virginia Infantry during the American Civil War. Tuck's mother died when he was 13. He attended county schools, Virgilina High School, and Chatham Training School (now Hargrave Military Academy). He attended the College of William and Mary for two years, earning a teacher's certificate and working for a year as a teacher/principal in Northumberland County. Tuck then enlisted in the U.S. Marine Corps and served in 1917 in the Caribbean. Tuck returned to attend law school at the Washington and Lee University School of Law, graduating in 1921. In 1929 he married widow (and former schoolteacher) Eva Lovelace Dillard (1891–1975), to whom he remained married until her death in 1975, raising her son Lester Layne (L.L.) Dillard Jr. as his own.

Career

Upon being admitted to Virginia bar, Tuck maintained a private legal practice in Halifax for decades, eventually with his stepson L.L. Dillard.

His career as an elected official began in 1923, when Halifax County voters elected Tuck as their delegate (a part-time position) to the Virginia General Assembly. He was re-elected once but declined to run for re-election in 1929, citing the need to grow his legal business to support his new family. However, when his elected successor died, Tuck was drafted in 1930 and served the remainder of the term. He was then elected to the Virginia State Senate in 1931, where he became a friend of U.S. Senator Harry F. Byrd, a former governor. During the national New Deal, state Senator Tuck worked to repeal Prohibition and sponsored new child labor laws, as well as an unemployment compensation system, old age assistance and jail reforms. He also helped develop the state park system.

In 1941, Tuck sought statewide office, but Senator Byrd slated Colgate Darden to run for Governor of Virginia, so Tuck was slated for and won election as the 25th Lieutenant Governor of Virginia. He served from 1942 to 1946 under Governor Darden, and gained visibility throughout the Commonwealth. Tuck defeated his Republican opponent, S. Floyd Landreth by a 2 to 1 margin and won election as governor.

As governor from 1946 to 1950, Tuck demonstrated his fiscal conservatism as a Dixiecrat by reorganizing state government and enacting a right-to-work law. He also created a state water pollution control agency, helped reform state schools and mental hospitals, as well as constructed roads. Governor Tuck gained national exposure, however, for labor unrest in his home state. He worked with Senator Harry Byrd to oppose President Harry Truman, although a fellow Democrat, especially Truman's plan to establish a Fair Employment Practices Commission. Once, as governor, Tuck drafted workers of the Virginia Electric Power Company into the state's national guard to avoid a threatened strike in an unionization effort. Transportation and coal also experienced labor unrest.

Tuck's resumption of legal practice in South Boston after his governorship proved short-lived, for he rose within the Byrd Organization. In 1953 Tuck won election as a Democrat to U.S. Congress vacated by Thomas Bahnson Stanley who had resigned to run for Governor of Virginia. A militant segregationist, Congressman Tuck opposed most major items of civil rights legislation during the 1950s and 1960s. Like U.S. Senator Harry F. Byrd, Tuck promised "massive resistance" to the Supreme Court's 1954 and 1955 decisions banning segregation, Brown v. Board of Education, and helped draft the Stanley Plan—a series of state laws designed to legally avoid Brown, most of which were soon declared unconstitutional. He was a signatory to the 1956 Southern Manifesto. Tuck was a member of the U.S. House of Representative's Committee on Un-American Activities (HUAC) and vehemently opposed the Civil Rights Act of 1965.

He was a delegate to Democratic National Conventions of 1948 and 1952, and in 1967 announced he would not seek reelection to Congress, citing health problems. He remained a power broker in the state for years. He retired from his law practice in South Boston in 1979, after suffering a stroke.

Death and legacy
He is buried beside his wife in Oak Ridge Cemetery in South Boston. Virginia named highway 58 in Halifax County after Tuck, and elected a historical marker in his memory.

His personal papers, including papers from his time as congressman and governor, are held by the Special Collections Research Center at the College of William & Mary.  His executive papers from his time as governor are held by the Library of Virginia.

His birthplace and home Buckshoal Farm was listed on the National Register of Historic Places in 1987.

Electoral history

1945; Tuck was elected Governor of Virginia with 66.57% of the vote, defeating Republican Sidney Floyd Landreth and Independent Howard Hearnes Carwile.
1953; Tuck was elected to the U.S. House of Representatives with 57.81% of the vote in a special election, defeating Republican Lorne R. Campbell.
1954; Tuck was re-elected unopposed.
1956; Tuck was re-elected unopposed.
1958; Tuck was re-elected unopposed.
1960; Tuck was re-elected unopposed.
1962; Tuck was re-elected unopposed.
1964; Tuck was re-elected with 63.47% of the vote, defeating Republican Robert L. Gilliam.
1966; Tuck was re-elected with 56.18% of the vote, defeating Republican Gilliam.

References

External links
Finding aid for the Milliam Munford Tuck Papers
SCRC Wiki page for William Munford Tuck

Tuck, William Mumford
Tuck, William Mumford
Tuck, William Mumford
Tuck, William Mumford
Tuck, William Mumdford
Tuck, William Mumford
Tuck, William Mumford
Tuck, William Mumford
Washington and Lee University School of Law alumni
People from Halifax County, Virginia
United States Marines
Democratic Party members of the United States House of Representatives from Virginia
Democratic Party governors of Virginia
Virginia Dixiecrats
United States Marine Corps personnel of World War I
Conservatism in the United States
Hargrave Military Academy alumni
Members of the Benevolent and Protective Order of Elks